American Beast is the fifth studio album by LUXT, released on January 14, 2003, by Blackliner Records. Vocalist Anna Christine considers the album to be the band's best recording. LUXT disbanded in 2005 after the album's release due to divergent opinions in artistic direction, with vocalist Anna Christine wanting to become mainstream and the rest of the band preferring to remain in the underground scene.

Reception

Allmusic critic Brian O'Neill said "American Beast comes off like Shirley Manson fronting Marilyn Manson: moody and with gothic overtones, but also quite metallic and loaded with Rammstein-inspired industrial-strength electronics as well." O'Neill also praised Anna Christine's vocals, saying "her voice is sultry and completely muliebral, whether singing about blow jobs (or not, since "Suck It Down" is probably a metaphor for something) or the pangs of anguish that one feels just trying to make it through the day." While agreeing on Christine's vocal prowess Exclaim! was also more mixed in its reception towards the music, saying "the guitars are average at best with their repetitive insipid cries" and "he samples are palatable and personable but not overly groundbreaking." Patrick Schabe of PopMatters welcomed the band's diverse musical palette and praised the integration of goth and techno elements in their compositions.

Track listing

Accolades

Personnel
Adapted from the American Beast liner notes.

LUXT
 Anna Christine – vocals, arrangements, production
 Crash – bass guitar
 David Hiscook – guitar, bass guitar, photography
 Erie Loch – guitar, bass guitar, drums, keyboards, programming, sampler, vocals, arrangements, production, engineering, remixing, photography
 Frost Reed – drums

Release history

References

External links 
 

2003 albums
LUXT albums